Baydar Shamsu  is a Syrian village in Muhambal Nahiyah in Ariha District, Idlib.  According to the Syria Central Bureau of Statistics (CBS), Baydar Shamsu had a population of 768 in the 2004 census.

References 

Populated places in Ariha District
Villages in Idlib Governorate